Cuvelier is a surname. Notable people with the surname include:

Florent Cuvelier (born 1992), Belgian footballer
Henri Cuvelier (1908–1937), French water polo player
Jean Cuvelier, bishop of Matadi
Jehan le Cuvelier d'Arras, French trouvère
Joseph Cuvelier (1869–1947), Belgian archivist and historian.
Paul Cuvelier, Belgian comics artist